BM or bm may refer to:

Arts and entertainment

Music 

 BM (rapper), born Matthew Kim, a  Korean-American rapper
 BM (album), a 2008 Barbara Morgenstern album
 B minor, a musical chord (Bm)
 Bachelor of Music, an academic degree
 Beautiful music, a radio format
 Black metal, a genre of music

Other uses in arts and entertainment 
 Bashir Mirza, a Pakistani painter
 BM or "Bad Manners" in video gaming, cf. glossary of video game terms#BM

Business

Business terminology
 Brick and mortar or B&M

Businesses
 Birmingham Midshires, a division of the Bank of Scotland
 Bolinder-Munktell, a Swedish tractor manufacturer, now part of Volvo
 Bolliger & Mabillard, B&M, a Swiss roller coaster manufacturer
 Boston and Maine Corporation, B&M, a former US railway company
 British Midland International, former airline rebranded bmi
 BMI Regional, IATA airline code

Science and technology

Health and medicine 
 Bachelor of Medicine, an academic degree
 Bacterial meningitis
 Basement membrane
 Boehringer Mannheim test, a blood test performed using a glucose meter
 Bowel movement

Other uses in science and technology 
 .bm, Bermuda Internet top-level domain
 Builder's Measurement or Builder's Old Measurement of ship size (18th and 19th century)

Language 
 Bambara language (ISO 639-1: bm), a West African language
 Malaysian language, or Bahasa Malaysia

Military 
 Bandmaster in the British Army and Royal Marines
 Boatswain's mate (United States Navy)
 Boatswain's mate (United States Coast Guard)
 Bravery Medal (Australia)
 Brigade major in the British Army and Commonwealth armies
 Martin BM, a United States Navy torpedo-bomber aircraft

Places 
 Bermuda (ISO 3166-1 2-letter country code)
 .bm, the Internet country code top-level domain for Bermuda
 Birch Mountain, location of Birch Mountains kimberlite field, Alberta, Canada
 Burma (FIPS Pub 10-4 code and obsolete NATO country code)
 Bukit Merah, Singapore
 The British Museum, London

Other uses
 British Movement, a British fascist group